Corporate real estate is the real property held or used by a business enterprise or organization for its own operational purposes.  A corporate real estate portfolio typically includes a corporate headquarters and a number of branch offices, and perhaps also various manufacturing and retail sites.

Concept
Corporate real estate may also describe the functional practice, department, or profession that is concerned with the planning, acquisition, design, construction/fit-up, management, and administration of real property on behalf of a company. Generally, corporate real estate professionals approach the real estate market from the owner-occupant perspective, both leased or the buy-side, primarily demand perspective, similar to corporate purchasing or procurement. As such, they seek to contain costs, and may benefit from economic environments that are described by most as "weak".

Although closely related to facilities management and property management, Corporate real estate as a concept is usually broader in corporate functional scope but more narrow within the real estate sector.  For instance, corporate real estate professionals (or departments) typically dedicate greater emphasis and time on multi-site long-range planning (often called "portfolio planning" or "strategic planning").  However, corporate real estate is almost exclusively focused on commercial properties types (mostly office, with industrial and retail depending on the company); residential properties are rare in a corporate portfolio.

See also
 Real Property
 Real estate
 Facilities Management
 Property Management
 CAFM
 Building Automation
 Lease Administration

References

Property management